Webb is a small lunar impact crater that is located near the eastern edge of the Mare Fecunditatis, in the eastern part of the Moon near the equator. It was named after British astronomer Thomas William Webb. It is to the north of the prominent crater Langrenus, and west of Maclaurin.

The interior of Webb is relatively dark compared with the inner walls of the rim, and it has a low hill at the midpoint of the interior. On the lunar mare to the north is a faint marking of a ray system that appears to radiate from this crater. West of the crater is the wrinkle ridge Dorsa Andrusov.

Satellite craters
By convention these features are identified on lunar maps by placing the letter on the side of the crater midpoint that is closest to Webb.

The following craters have been renamed by the IAU.
 Webb R — See Condon (crater).

See also 
 Asteroid 3041 Webb

References

 
 
 
 
 
 
 
 
 
 
 

Impact craters on the Moon
Mare Fecunditatis